Sušica is a village southeast of Muljava in the Municipality of Ivančna Gorica in central Slovenia. The area is part of the historical region of Lower Carniola. The municipality is now included in the Central Slovenia Statistical Region.

Name
Sušica was attested in historical sources as Durre in 1250, Darrendorff in 1463, Dardorff in 1464, and Schusitz in 1505. Like the German names (cf. dürr 'arid'), the Slovenian name is derived from the adjective suh 'dry', originally referring to a seasonal creek that would go dry during droughts. Locally, the village is known as Šica.

Church
The local church is dedicated to Saint Stephen and belongs to the Parish of Krka. It dates to the late 15th century.

References

External links
Sušica on Geopedia

Populated places in the Municipality of Ivančna Gorica